Schlägerstraße is a station on the B tunnel (all lines) of the Hanover Stadtbahn. It is located inside the district of Hannover Südstadt.

References

Hanover Stadtbahn stations